The Continental Basketball Association (CBA) Player of the Year, formerly known as the Eastern Basketball Association (EBA) Most Valuable Player and the CBA Most Valuable Player, was an annual award given to the best player in the CBA. The winner was selected by a vote of the league's head coaches. Twenty-three of the winners have been guards, 30 have been forwards, and only four have been centers. There have been two players—Jack McCloskey and Vincent Askew—who were two time recipients of the award. The Scranton Miners/Apollos have had six players named the EBA Most Valuable Player. The league's name was changed from the Eastern Basketball Association to the Continental Basketball Association following the 1977–78 season. Since then the Quad City Thunder have had the most players to win the award with five. The Montana Golden Nuggets and the Yakima/Yakama Sun Kings are the only teams to have one of their players win the award for three seasons in a row.

Key

Table

References

Player
ConX
Lists of basketball players in the United States